XHTAP-FM is a radio station on 98.7 FM in Tapachula, Chiapas. The station is owned by Radiorama and known as La Poderosa.

History
XHTAP began as XETAP-AM 960, with a concession awarded on July 17, 1986. It has always been owned by Radiorama.

In 2019, as part of wholesale operator changes at Radiorama Chiapas, XHTAP dropped La Bestia Grupera and became "Radio Soconusco", playing more traditional Regional Mexican music.

References

Radio stations in Chiapas
Radio stations established in 1987